Leuthneria is a genus of moths in the family Sesiidae containing only one species Leuthneria ruficincta, which is known from Sudan.

References

Endemic fauna of Sudan
Sesiidae